Your Man is the second studio album by American country music artist Josh Turner. It released on January 24, 2006 and debuted at No. 2 on the U.S. Billboard 200 chart, and debuted at No. 1 on the Top Country Albums

"Your Man" was the first single released followed by "Would You Go with Me" and "Me and God." Also included is a cover of Don Williams' 1991 hit single "Lord Have Mercy on a Country Boy".

Grammy Award nominations
Turner received two 2007 Grammy nominations for his work on Your Man. He received a Best Male Country Vocal Performance nomination for the album's first track and second single, "Would You Go with Me" and a Best Country Album nomination.

Track listing

Chart performance and certifications
Your Man debuted at number four on the U.S. Billboard 200, and debuted at number one on the Top Country Albums chart, becoming his first number-one country album. On February 28, 2006 it was certified Gold, on August 4, 2006 it was certified Platinum and on March 1, 2007 it was certified 2× Platinum by the RIAA.

Weekly charts

Year-end charts

Certifications

Personnel

Musicians
 John Anderson - duet vocals (6)
 Ron Block - banjo (1)
 Jim "Moose" Brown - piano (1,6), Wurlitzer (5)
 Melodie Crittenden - background vocals (5)
 Eric Darken - percussion (all tracks), vibraphone (3,4)
 Shannon Forrest - drums (all tracks)
 Kevin "Swine" Grantt - bass guitar (1,4,5,6,7,8,10), upright bass (2,3,9,11)
 Aubrey Haynie - fiddle (except 1 and 11), mandolin (1,9,11)
 Wes Hightower - background vocals (except 9)
 Steve Hinson - dobro (2,7,9,11), pedal steel guitar (3,4,5,6,7,8,10)
 Gene Johnson - background vocals (9)
 Mike Johnson - dobro (1)
 Jeff King - electric guitar (1,5) baritone guitar (1)
 B. James Lowry - acoustic guitar (1,5,6)
 Pat McLaughlin - background vocals (5)
 Liana Manis - background vocals (3)
 Gordon Mote - piano (3,4,7,8,9,10), Hammond B-3 organ (3,10,11), clavinet (2), Wurlitzer (11)
 Kim Parent - background vocals (5)
 Marty Roe - background vocals (9)
 Brent Rowan - electric guitar (2,3,4,6,7,8,10,11), baritone guitar (7,9,10), six-string bass guitar (2), tic tac bass (8)
 "Shoulder Man" - cymbal ride (11)
 Ralph Stanley - duet vocals (9)
 Chris Stapleton - background vocals (5)
 Bryan Sutton - acoustic guitar (3,4,9,10,11), banjo (2,9,11)
 Russell Terrell - background vocals (except 1 and 9)
 Josh Turner - lead vocals (all tracks)
 Biff Watson - acoustic guitar (2,7,8)
 Dana Williams - background vocals (9)

Technical
 Chuck Ainlay - engineer
 Brady Barnett - digital editing
 Richard Barrow - engineer, mixing
 Drew Bollman - mixing assistant
 Neal Cappellino  - engineer, digital editing
 Greg Droman - engineer, mixing
 Todd Gunnerson - assistant engineer
 Adam Hatley - digital editing
 Margaret Malandruccolo - photography
 Melissa Mattey - mixing assistant
 Justin Niebank  - mixing
 Frank Rogers - producer
 Steve Short - mixing assistant
 Phillip Stein - Production Assistant
 Trish Townsend  - wardrobe
 Josh Turner - art direction
 Hank Williams - mastering
 Debra Wingo - make-up, hairstylist

References

2006 albums
MCA Records albums
Josh Turner albums
Albums produced by Frank Rogers (record producer)